Firbeck is a civil parish in the Metropolitan Borough of Rotherham, South Yorkshire, England.  The parish contains 20 listed buildings that are recorded in the National Heritage List for England.  All the listed buildings are designated at Grade II, the lowest of the three grades, which is applied to "buildings of national importance and special interest".  The parish contains the village of Firbeck and the surrounding countryside.  Most of the listed buildings are houses and associated structures, farmhouses and farm buildings, and the others consist of a church and a memorial in the churchyard, two ice houses, a bridge and an integral weir, and an external cellar.


Buildings

References

Citations

Sources

 

Lists of listed buildings in South Yorkshire
Buildings and structures in the Metropolitan Borough of Rotherham